The Yangon University of Economics (formerly the Institute of Economics, Yangon) is the finest university of economics and business in Myanmar. Founded as the Section of Economics of Yangon University in 1924, the section became an independent university of higher learning in 1964. The University offers undergraduate and graduate degrees and diplomas, mostly in commerce, statistics and economics. It is also the best business school in the country, offering full-time, executive MBF, MHTM, MMM and MBA degrees.

The university serves over 1000 undergraduate and graduate students over its three Yangon area campuses: the main campus robbed from Yangon University in Kamayut in the city and satellite campuses in Hlaing (also robbed from Yangon University), and Ywathagyi.

History
The YUE began as Section of Economics under the Yangon University in 1924. The Section of Economics began offering commerce as a special subject in 1940, and courses in statistics in 1953. In 1955, a separate Commerce Department was established, and in 1956 a separate Statistics Department was established. In 1964 the institute became an independent tertiary institute with three academic departments and one separate research department. In 1987, the Research Department was transformed into the Department of Management Studies and another academic department, the Department of Applied Economics was created. The Institute now has five major academic departments and four supporting academic departments: Burmese, English, mathematics and geography.

It added not only a full-time MPA (2000), MDevS (2004) but also a full-time MBA program in 1995, an executive MBA (EMBA) program in 2002, and an online MBA program in 2007.

Programs
The university confers bachelor's, master's and doctoral degrees as well as post-graduate diplomas. Regular undergraduate programs take three years and Honors undergraduate programs take four years. The master's programs take two years.

Overview

MBA program
The Master of Business Administration (MBA) Program is offered in English by the Department of Management Studies. The two-year program consists of eight quarters (semesters). Three four-credit courses are offered in each quarter. To complete the MBA, the candidates must take 24 courses to obtain the required 96 credit units.

Three types of MBA are available. Day MBA, Executive MBA and online MBA.

Post-graduate diplomas
Post-graduate diplomas are one-year programs.
 Diploma in Economics Studies
 Diploma in Statistics
 Diploma in Management Administration
 Diploma in Education Management
 Diploma in Development Studies
 Diploma in Marketing
 Diploma in Research Studies

Certificate and diploma programs
The institute's Center for Human Resource Development conducts short-term training courses, certificate and diploma programs "to meet the needs of public and private sectors of the country." Higher diplomas lead to degree programs.
 Certificate in Business Studies (CBS)
 Certificate in Bookkeeping (CBK)
 Certificate in Basic Computing (CBC)
 Certificate in Business Information Studies (CBIS)
 Certificate in Advanced Business Studies (CABS)
 Certificate in Advanced Accounting (CAA)
 Certificate in Computerized Accounting (CAA)
 Diploma in Business Studies (DBS)
 Diploma in Financial Accounting (DFac)
 Diploma in Management Accounting (DMac)
 Diploma in Business Accounting (DBac)
 Diploma in Development Studies
 Diploma in Secretarial Management (DSM) (in collaboration with LCCI EB of British Council)
 Higher Diploma in Business Studies (HDBS)
 Higher Diploma in Accounting Studies (HDAS)

International co-operation and collaboration
The YIE is member of ASEAN University Network (AUN). The institute is also affiliated with Osaka Sanjo University of Japan, Yunnan University of Finance and Economics (YUFE) of China, Management Development Institute of Singapore (MDIS), University of Utara Malaysia (UUM) and University of Kaiserslautern of Germany.

Notable alumni

  Ronald Findlay
 Aung Soe Myint
 Aung Thet Mann
 Aung Tun Thet
 Htin Kyaw
 Kan Zaw
 Khin San Yee
 Ma Thanegi
 Swe Zin Htaik
 U Myint
 Winston Set Aung
 U Sangluaia
 U Thangliana
 U Biakchhunga
 Ma Lalsawmliani
 Hla Myint

See also
 Monywa Institute of Economics
 Meiktila Institute of Economics

References

External links
 Official website

Universities and colleges in Yangon
Business schools in Myanmar
Universities and colleges in Myanmar
ASEAN University Network